San Antorium was Lowlife's fourth album, released in 1991 in Scotland on Nightshift Records.  The LP was recorded at Tower Studios in Glasgow, Scotland. Personnel changes prior to the album's recording involved the near-simultaneous departures of guitarist Hamish McIntosh and drummer Grant McDowall, who were replaced by Hugh Duggie and Greg Orr, respectively.  Orr's role was somewhat limited as several of the tracks employed drum programming and/or drum loops.  LTM Recordings  reissued much of the band's entire back catalogue on CD in 2006, and San Antorium was released with five bonus tracks taken from the band's "Black Sessions" demo album.

Track listing
All tracks composed by Lowlife
 "Jaw"   – 3:31
 "Inside In"   – 5:09
 "My Mothers Fatherly Father"   – 4:08
 "Big Fat Funky Whale"   – 3:51
 "Good As It Gets"   – 5:05
 "Suddenly Violently Random"   – 4:02
 "June Wilson"   – 4:52
 "Give Up Giving Up"   – 4:15
 "Bathe"   – 4:06
 "As Old As New"   – 4:17

Bonus Tracks on 2006 CD Reissue:
 "Missing the Kick"  – 3:48
 "Bittersweet" – 3:52
 "Forever Filthy" – 3:20
 "Neverending Shroud" – 3:30
 "We the Cheated" – 3:23

Personnel
Lowlife 
Craig Lorentson - vocals
Hugh Duggie - guitar
Will Heggie - bass guitar
Greg Orr McDowall - drums
Additional musicians
Calum MacLean - guitars, three-hand bass, chorus guitar, programming
Steven Nelson - additional drum programming
Martin Fleming - drum loops, Burst snare drum loops
Linda Jackson - backing vocals
Joyce Monaghen - backing vocals
Jacqueline Balloch - backing vocals

References

Lowlife (band) albums
1991 albums